Sa Paraiso ni Efren (English Title: Efren's Paradise) is a 1999 Tagalog-language film that tackles emotional entanglements that interweave an unusual four-way relationship.

Plot
Melvin, a social worker, meets handsome stripper Efren and they become friends. When Melvin's mother dies, he moves in with Efren and his three female roommates.

Cast
Allan Paule as Melvin
Ana Capri as Ana
Ynez Veneracion as Magda
Anton Bernardo as Efren
Marinella Moran as Rina
Poppo Lontoc as Archie
Simon Ibarra
Alison VII as Anthony
Anita Linda
Migue Moreno
Jackie Castillejos
Girlie Alcantara
Andy Cabral
Alex Datu
Jeric Evangelista
Peter Flores
Jun Pandi
C.J. Reyes
Vice Ganda (uncredited)

External links
 

1999 films
Philippine LGBT-related films
1990s Tagalog-language films
1999 drama films
Gay-related films
LGBT-related drama films
1999 LGBT-related films
Films directed by Maryo J. de los Reyes